Stanley Patrick Dickinson (7 March 1890 — 25 June 1972) was an English cricketer who played for Derbyshire in 1909.

Dickinson was born in Norton, Derbyshire and educated at Haileybury College where he was in the cricket XI in 1906 and 1907. He made two appearances for Derbyshire during the 1909 season, his first coming in an innings defeat at the hands of Yorkshire and his second in a draw against Warwickshire.

Dickinson was a right-handed batsman and scored 13 runs overall. He was a right-arm medium-fast bowler and took one wicket.

Dickinson died at Dolbenmaen, near Criccieth, Caernarvonshire at the age of 82.

References

1890 births
1972 deaths
People educated at Haileybury and Imperial Service College
English cricketers
Derbyshire cricketers
Cricketers from Sheffield
People from Norton Lees
Cricketers from Derbyshire